All Blues is an album by vocalist Rachel Gould and trumpeter Chet Baker which was recorded in 1979 and released on the French Bingow label.

Track listing 
 "All Blues" (Miles Davis) – 5:31
 "My Funny Valentine" (Richard Rodgers, Lorenz Hart) – 5:36
 "Baubles, Bangles, & Beads" (Robert Wright, George Forrest) – 6:52
 "Straight" (Thelonious Monk) – 3:51
 "Round Midnight" (Monk, Cootie Williams, Bernie Hanighen) – 5:05
 "I've Got You Under My Skin" (Cole Porter) – 4:57
 "Phil's Bossa" (Jean Paul Florens) – 5:30

Personnel 
Rachel Gould – vocals
Chet Baker – trumpet
Henry Florens – piano
Jean Paul Florens – guitar 
Jim Richardson – bass
Tony Mann – drums

References 

Rachel Gould albums
Chet Baker albums
1979 albums